Al-Kafi (literally "The Sufficient") is a Twelver Shia hadith collection compiled by Muhammad ibn Ya'qub al-Kulayni. It is divided into three sections: Uṣūl al-Kāfī, dealing with epistemology, theology, history, ethics, supplication, and the Qurʾān, Furūʿ al-Kāfī, which is concerned with practical and legal issues, and Rawdat (or Rauda) al-Kāfī, which includes miscellaneous traditions, many of which are lengthy letters and speeches transmitted from the Imāms.
In total, al-Kāfī comprises 16,199 narrations.

Contents

Usul (Fundamentals) al-Kafi
The first eight books of al-Kāfī are commonly referred to as Uṣūl al-kāfī. The first type-set edition of the al-Kāfī, which was published in eight volumes, placed Uṣūl al-kāfī in the first two volumes. Generally speaking, Uṣūl al-kāfī contains traditions that deal with epistemology, theology, history, ethics, supplication, and the Qurʾān.

Furūʿ al-Kāfī 
Furūʿ al-Kāfī: Books 9 through 34 are referred to as Furūʿ al-kāfī and are found in volumes three through seven of the first type-set edition. Furūʿ al-kāfī contains traditions that deal predominantly with practical and legal issues.

Rawdat al-Kāfī
Rawdat al-Kāfī: The final book stands alone as Rawḍah al-kāfī, which is found in volume eight. Rawḍah al-kāfī contains nearly 600 miscellaneous traditions, many of which are lengthy letters and speeches, not arranged in any particular order.

Authenticity

Most Shia scholars do not make any assumptions about the authenticity of a hadith book. Most believe that there are no "sahih" hadith books that are completely reliable. Hadith books are compiled by fallible people, and thus realistically, they inevitably have a mixture of strong and weak hadiths. Kulayni himself stated in his preface that he only collected hadiths he thought were important and sufficient for Muslims to know, and he left the verification of these hadiths up to later scholars. Kulayni also states, in reference to hadiths:

 "whatever (hadith) agrees with the Book of God (the Qur'an), accept it. And whatever contradicts it, reject it"

According to the great Imami scholar Zayn al-Dīn al-ʿĀmili, known as ash-Shahīd ath-Thāni (911-966/1505-1559), who examined the asanād or the chains of transmission of al-Kāfi's traditions, 5,072 are considered ṣaḥīḥ (sound); 144 are regarded as ḥasan (good), second category; 1,118 are held to be muwathaq (trustworthy), third category; 302 are adjudged to be qawi (strong) and 9,485 traditions which are categorized as ḍaʿīf (weak).

Scholarly remarks

 The author (Muḥammad ibn Yaʿqub al-Kulayni) stated in his Preface of Al-Kafi:

"You said that you would love to have a sufficient book (kitābun kāfin) containing enough of all the religious sciences to suffice the student; to serve as a reference for the disciple; from which those who seek knowledge of the religion and want to act on it can draw authentic traditions from the Truthful [imams]—may God’s peace be upon them—and a living example upon which to act, by which our duty to God—almighty is he and sublime—and to the commands of his Prophet—may God’s mercy be on him and his progeny—is fulfilled...God—to whom belongs all praise—has facilitated the compilation of what you requested. I hope it is as you desired." 

 Imam Khomeini (a prominent 20th century Shī‘ah scholar) said:
    
 "Do you think it is enough [kafi] for our religious life to have its laws summed up in al-Kāfī and then placed upon a shelf?"

The general idea behind this metaphor is that Khomeini objected to the laziness of many ignorant people of his day who simply kept al-Kafi on their shelf, and ignored or violated it in their daily lives, assuming that they would somehow be saved from Hell just by possessing the book. Khomeini argued that Islamic law should be an integral part of everyday life for the believer, not just a stale manuscript to be placed on a shelf and forgotten. The irony of the allusion is telling; Khomeini implicitly says that al-Kafi (the sufficient) is not kafi (enough) to make you a faithful Muslim or be counted among the righteous, unless you use the wisdom contained within it and act on * The famous Shī‘ah scholar Shaykh Sadūq didn't believe in the complete authenticity of al-Kāfī. 
Khoei points this out in his "Mu‘jam Rijāl al-Hadīth", or "Collection of Men of Narrations", in which he states:

 أنّ الشيخ الصدوق : قدّس سرّه : لم يكن يعتقد صحّة جميع مافي الكافي 
"Shaykh as-Sadūq did not regard all of the traditions in al-Kāfī to be Sahih (truthful)."

The scholars have made these remarks, to remind the people that one cannot simply pick the book up, and take whatever they like from it as truthful. Rather, an exhaustive process of authentication must be applied, which leaves the understanding of the book in the hands of the learned. From the Shia point of view, any book other than the Qur'an, as well as individual hadiths or hadith narrators can be objectively questioned and scrutinized as to their reliability.

Shia view of al-Kafi relative to other hadith books 
Kulayni himself stated in his preface that he only collected hadiths he thought were important and sufficient for Muslims to know (at a time when many Muslims were illiterate and ignorant of the true beliefs of Islam, and Ṣūfi and gnostic sects were gaining popularity), and he left the verification of these hadiths up to later scholars. Kulayni also states, in reference to hadiths: "whatever (hadith) agrees with the Book of God (the Qur'an), accept it. And whatever contradicts it, reject it".

The author of al-Kāfi never intended for it to be politicized as "infallible", he only compiled it to give sincere advice based on authentic Islamic law (regardless of the soundess of any one particular hadith), and to preserve rare hadiths and religious knowledge in an easily accessible collection for future generations to study.

Al-Kāfi is the most comprehensive collection of traditions from the formative period of Islamic scholarship. It has been held in the highest esteem by generation after generation of Muslim scholars. Shaykh al-Mufīd (d.1022 CE) extolled it as "one of the greatest and most beneficial of Shia books." Al-Shahīd al-ʾAwwāl (d.1385 CE) and al-Muḥaqqiq al-Karāki (d.1533 CE) have said, "No book has served the Shia as it has." The father of ʿAllāmah al Majlisī said, "Nothing like it has been written for Islam."

Commentaries
Sharh Usul al-Kafi, a commentary on the Uṣul al-Kāfi by Mohammad Salih al-Mazandarani
Mir'at al-Uqul‎ /Mirror of the Mind, a commentary on al-Kāfi by Mohammad Baqir Majlisi
Sharh Usool Al-Kafi by Mulla Sadra
Sahih al Kafi by Muhammad Baqir al-Behbudi

See also

List of Shi'a books

References

External links

Al-Kafi English Translation (Volumes 1, 2, 3, 4, 5, 6, 7, 8), compiled by Muḥammad Ya'qūb al-Kulayni, translated by Hub-e-Ali organization, publicly available for free.
'Usul al-Kafi English Translation, E-Book Volumes 1-8', compiled by Muḥammad Ya'qūb al-Kulayni, translated by Muḥammad Sarwar, published by the Islamic Seminary INC NY, available for purchase.
'Al-Kafi with translation and commentary by Islamic Texts Institute'
Selections from Usul al-Kafi
'Kiṫâbu-l-Kâfî', compiled by Muḥammad Ya`qûb Kulaynî, published by the Islamic Seminary INC NY, translated by Muḥammad Sarwar.

Shia hadith collections
Ja'fari jurisprudence
Books of Shia Rijal